The shield of Achilles is the shield that Achilles uses in his fight with Hector, famously described in a passage in Book 18, lines 478–608 of Homer's Iliad. The intricately detailed imagery on the shield has inspired many different interpretations of its significance.

Overview
In the poem, Achilles lends Patroclus his armor in order to lead the Achaean army into battle. Ultimately, Patroclus is killed in battle by Hector, and Achilles' armor is stripped from his body and taken by Hector as spoils. The loss of his companion prompts Achilles to return to battle, so his mother Thetis, a nymph, asks the god Hephaestus to provide replacement armor for her son. He obliges, and forges a shield with spectacular decorative imagery.

Homer's description of the shield is the first known example of ekphrasis in ancient Greek poetry; ekphrasis is a rhetorical figure in which a detailed (textual) description is given of a (visual) work of art. Besides providing narrative exposition, it can add deeper meaning to an artwork by reflecting on the process of its creation, in turn allowing the audience to envision artwork that they can't see.

The passage in which Homer describes the creation of the shield has influenced many later poems, including the Shield of Heracles once attributed to Hesiod. Virgil's description of the shield of Aeneas in Book Eight of the Aeneid is clearly modeled on Homer. The poem The Shield of Achilles (1952) by W. H. Auden reimagines Homer's description in 20th century terms. Of other significance, this passage is recognized as the first example of cosmological mapping in the history of Greece.

Description

Homer gives a detailed description of the imagery which decorates the new shield.  Starting from the shield's center and moving outward, circle layer by circle layer, the shield is laid out as follows:

 The Earth, sky and sea, the sun, the moon and the constellations: Pleiades,  Hyades, Orion, and Ursa Major (484–89)
 "Two beautiful cities full of people": in one a wedding and a law case are taking place (490–508); the other city is besieged by one feuding army and the shield shows an ambush and a battle (509–40).
 A field being plowed for the third time (541–49).
 A king's estate where the harvest is being reaped (550–60).
 A vineyard with grape pickers and children(561–72).
 A "herd of straight-horned cattle"; the lead bull has been attacked by a pair of savage lions which the herdsmen and their dogs are trying to beat off (573–86).
 A picture of a sheep farm (587–89).
 A dancing floor where young men and women are dancing and courting (590–606).
 The great stream of Ocean (607–609).

Interpretations

The shield of Achilles can be read in a variety of different ways. One interpretation is that the shield represents a microcosm of civilization, in which all aspects of life are shown. The depiction of law suggests the existence of social order within one city, while feuding armies depict a darker side of humanity. The imagery of nature and the universe also reinforce the belief that the shield is a microcosm of Greek life, as it can be seen as a reflection of their perception of the world. In a poetic and descriptive way, some scholars read it as a summation of the whole of human knowledge in the Homeric era. Also, the sun and the moon are shown shining simultaneously, which some consider representative of a general understanding of the universe and awareness to the cosmological order of life.

The shield shows images of conflict and discord by depicting the shield's layers as a series of contrasts – i.e. war and peace, work and festival. Wolfgang Schadewaldt, a German writer, argues that these intersecting antitheses show the basic forms of a civilized, essentially orderly life.  This contrast is also seen as a way of making “us…see [war] in relation to peace.".

References

External links 
Iliad 18. 490–508. 
Book 8 of The Aeneid. Available in English. 
W. H. Auden's "The Shield of Achilles". 

Greek shields
Mythological shields
Achilles
Iliad
Hephaestus